Massacre is a fictional supervillain appearing in American comic books published by Marvel Comics. He primarily appears in Spider-Man related publications. The character is responsible for the murder of Ashley Kafka, a supporting character in various Spider-Man comic books and adapted media.

Publication history
The character's first appearance was in The Amazing Spider-Man #655 (published April 2011), during the Big Time storyline and was created by Dan Slott and Marcos Martin. The character also appeared in the following issue. Massacre would go on to make his return in the fourth issue of the Superior Spider-Man series.<ref>The Superior Spider-Man #4 April 2013</ref>  He was killed by the eponymous character in the next issue of that series.

Fictional character biography
Marcus Lyman was an ordinary man until a failed assassination attempt nearly claimed his life. He and his wife Judy Lyman were successful traders for a local Wall Street firm in New York City until an unhappy client planted a car bomb on their vehicle. The bomb killed Judy Lyman but Marcus survived with a piece of shrapnel from the explosion stuck in his forehead, penetrating his brain. The shrapnel was successfully removed but not without consequence: the damage had caused certain connections in Lyman's brain to no longer function. As a result, he lost his ability to feel emotion. He was sent to the Ravencroft Institute For The Criminally Insane, where he was treated by Dr. Ashley Kafka. Dr. Kafka was disturbed by Lyman and she found that there was nothing she could do to help his mental state, advising that he be held under observation indefinitely.

Now calling himself "Massacre", Marcus Lyman escaped the Ravencroft Institute and began kidnapping hostages. He held the hostages in a building, killing one of them to prove that he was willing to do so. The police began attempting negotiations with Massacre. Having temporarily lost his Spider-sense, Spider-Man arrived on the crime scene in an attempt to free the hostages, but was barely able to do so due to Massacre's heavy artillery. Massacre managed to escaped the scene, though not before Spider-Man secretly placed a Spider Tracer on him. Massacre resurfaced not long after, kidnapping another set of hostages at his former Wall Street firm but Spider-Man arrived on the scene prepared. Now donning a bullet proof costume and magnetic webbing, Spider-Man was able to defeat Massacre and rescue the hostages. When asked about his motivations, Massacre admitted that he had no particular reason for committing the crimes he did. Massacre was sent back to the Ravencroft Institute.

At the Ravencroft Institute, Dr. Kafka became increasingly afraid of Massacre, believing him to be her most dangerous patient. Her fears were realized when Massacre once again escaped Ravencroft, killing Kafka in the process. Massacre then went on a killing spree, threatening to murder anyone who crossed his path. Massacre soon took hostages at a Burger Town restaurant and, in retaliation for an employee pressing an alarm button, murdered them. Massacre then tracked down the manager of the Phizzy Cola company (Burger Town being one of its subsidiaries) and offered to help fix Phizzy Cola's public image after the killings by continuing to murder innocents wearing the logo of Phizzy Cola's rival company in exchange for a large sum of cash. Fearing for her own life, the manager agreed to Massacre's offer. Because of all of the harm Massacre has caused to innocent civilians, the Superior Spider-Man (Doctor Octopus's mind in Spider-Man's body) decides to end Masacre's killing spree by killing him with his own gun. Just before his death, Massacre claimed to feel a spark of emotion.

During the Dead No More: The Clone Conspiracy storyline, Massacre is among the villains "reanimated" by Jackal and his company New U Technologies. Although New U Technologies is supposed to revive individuals without any defects, Massacre assumedly retains the shrapnel in his brain as he is seen with the metal plate over his head. He was involved in a fight with the other cloned supervillains until it was broken up by a clone of Prowler.

During the Devil's Reign'' storyline, Massacre was seen as an inmate of the Myrmidon. Moon Knight fought him in one of the prison matches and defeated him.

Powers and abilities
While Massacre does not have any traditional super-powers, an accident made it nearly impossible for him to feel any emotion. Massacre also has a genius level intellect.

Equipment
Massacre uses guns and bombs.

See also
 List of Spider-Man enemies

References

External links
 Massacre at Marvel Wiki
 Massacre at Comic Vine

Characters created by Dan Slott
Comics characters introduced in 2011
Marvel Comics supervillains
Spider-Man characters
Fictional bankers
Fictional characters from New York City
Fictional characters with neurotrauma
Fictional gunfighters in comics
Fictional people in finance
Fictional mass murderers
Fictional rampage and spree killers